Miroslav Kanjevac (born 18 December 1963) is a Serbian professional basketball coach.

Coaching career

Men's basketball 
Kanjevac coached Profikolor, Hemofarm and Kovin.

Women's basketball 
Kanjevac coached Dinamo Pančevo, Partizan, Voždovac, Kovin, Radivoj Korać and Tamiš. In December 2009, he signed for Crvena zvezda.

In August 2015, Kanjevac became a head coach for the Partizan 1953. In December 2016, he resigned after one and a half year. In 2017, he signed for Vršac.

Career achievements and awards
 FR Yugoslavia Women's League champion: 1 (with Profi D Pančevo: 1996–97)
 FR Yugoslavia Women's Cup winner: 1 (with Profi D Pančevo: 1996–97)

References

External links 
 Coach Profile at eurobasket.com
 Biography at kosarkaskitrenerivojvodine.rs

1963 births
Living people
Serbian men's basketball coaches
Sportspeople from Pančevo
ŽKK Crvena zvezda coaches
ŽKK Partizan coaches
KK Profikolor coaches
ŽKK Dinamo Pančevo coaches